The Yavapai are a Native American tribe in Arizona. Historically, the Yavapai – literally “people of the sun” (from Enyaava “sun” + Paay “people”) – were divided into four geographical bands who identified as separate, independent peoples: the Ɖulv G’paaya, or Western Yavapai; the Yaavpe', or Northwestern Yavapai; the Gwev G’paaya, or Southeastern Yavapai; and the Wiipukpaa, or Northeastern Yavapai – Verde Valley Yavapai.

Another Yavapai band, which no longer exists, was the Mađqwarrpaa or "Desert People." Its people are believed to have mixed with the Mojave and Quechan peoples. The Yavapai have much in common with their linguistic relatives to the north, the Havasupai and the Hualapai. Often the Yavapai were mistaken as Apache by American settlers, who referred to them as "Mohave-Apache," "Yuma-Apache," or "Tonto-Apache".

Before the 1860s, when settlers began exploring for gold in the area, the Yavapai occupied an area of approximately 20,000 mi² (51800 km²) bordering the San Francisco Peaks to the north, the Pinaleno Mountains and Mazatzal Mountains to the southeast, and the Colorado River to the west, and almost to the Gila River and the Salt River to the south.

Pre-Contact culture

Subsistence

Before being confined to reservations, the Yavapai were mainly hunter-gatherers, following an annual round, migrating to different areas to follow the ripening of different edible plants and movement of game. Some tribes supplemented this diet with small-scale cultivation of the "three sisters" – maize, squash, and beans – in fertile streambeds. In particular, the Ɖo:lkabaya, who lived in lands that were less supportive of food gathering, turned to agriculture more than other Yavapai. They had to work to cultivate crops, as their land was also less supportive of agriculture. In turn, Ɖo:lkabaya often traded items such as animal skins, baskets, and agave to Quechan groups for food.

The main plant foods gathered were walnuts, saguaro fruits, juniper berries, acorns, sunflower seeds, manzanita berries and apples, hackberries, the bulbs of the Quamash, and the greens of the Lamb's quarters, Scrophularia, and Lupinus plants. Agave was the most crucial harvest, as it was the only plant food available from late fall through early spring. The hearts of the plant were roasted in stone-lined pits, and could be stored for later use. Primary animals hunted were deer, rabbit, jackrabbit, quail, and woodrat. Fish and water-borne birds were eschewed by most Yavapai groups. Some groups of Tolkepaya began eating fish after contact with their Quechan neighbors.

Dances 

The early Yavapai practiced traditional dances such as the Mountain Spirit Dance, War Dances, Victory Dances and Social Dances. The Mountain Spirit dance was a masked dance, which was used for guidance or healing of a sick person. The masked dancers represented Mountain Spirits, who were believed by Yavapai to dwell in Four Peaks, McDowell Mountains, Red Mountain (near Fort McDowell), Mingus Mountain-(Black Hills) near Camp Verde, and Granite Mountain near present-day Prescott. The Yavapai also believe that the Mountain Spirits dwelled in the caves of Montezuma Castle and Montezuma Well in the Verde Valley.

The modern Yavapai take part in several dances and singing, such as the Apache Sunrise Dance and the Bird Singing and Dancing of the Mojave people.

The Sunrise Dance Ceremony is not an ancient Yavapai ceremony. Apache and Yavapai often intermarried and adopted elements of each other's cultures; these two tribes reside together on the Camp Verde and Fort McDowell reservations. The Sunrise Dance is a four-day rite-of-transition for young Apache girls, which typically takes place from March through October. The sunrise dance is an ancient practice, unique to the Apache. It is related to the myth of the Changing Woman, a powerful figure in Apache culture who is believed to grant longevity. The power of Changing Woman is transferred to the pubescent girl through songs sung by the Medicine Man. A medicine man is joined by other tribal members in singing a series of songs, up to 32 which are believed to have first been sung by Changing Woman.
Bird Singing and Dancing Originally part of the culture of the Mojave people of the Colorado River region, bird singing and dancing has been adopted by modern Yavapai culture. Bird singing and dancing does not belong to the Yavapai people as a whole but this practice has been picked up by different tribes of the Yuman family. According to Mohave elders, the bird songs tell a story. An entire night is needed to sing the whole cycle, from sun down to sun up. This story tells the creation of the Yuman people and how they came to be.  Bird songs are sung accompanied by a gourd, usually painted with various designs and made with a handle made of cottonwood. Modern bird singing and dancing is used for various purposes such as mourning, celebration and social purposes.

Shelter

The Yavapai built brush shelter dwellings called Wa'm bu nya:va (Wom-boo-nya-va). In summer, they built simple lean-tos without walls. During winter months, closed huts (called uwas) would be built of ocotillo branches or other wood and covered with animal skins, grasses, bark, and/or dirt. In the Colorado River area, Ɖo:lkabaya built Uwađ a'mađva, a rectangular hut, that had dirt piled up against its sides for insulation, and a flat roof. They also sought shelter in caves or abandoned pueblos to escape the cold.

Social-political organization
The Yavapai main social-political organization were local groups of extended families, which were identified with certain geographic regions in which they resided. These local groups would form bands in times of war, raiding or defense. For most of Yavapai history, the family was the focal group, be it the nuclear family, or extended. This is partly because most food-providing sites were not large enough to support larger populations. However, exceptions are known.

Near Fish Creek, Arizona, was Ananyiké (Quail's Roost), a Guwevkabaya summer camp that supported upwards of 100 people at a time. It supported a prickly pear fruit harvest, and hunting of rabbits and woodrats. 
In winter, camps were formed of larger groups, consisting of several families. They separated into smaller groups at the end of winter, in time for the spring harvest.

Government among the Yavapai tended to be informal. There were no tribal chiefs, such as Chief of the Guwevkabaya or Chief of the Ɖo:lkabaya. Certain men became recognized leaders based on others choosing to follow them, heed their advice, and support their decisions. Men who were noted for their skills as warriors were called mastava ("not afraid") or bamulva ("person who goes forward"). Other warriors were willing to follow such men into combat. Some Yavapai men were noted for their wisdom and speaking ability. Called bakwauu ("person who talks"), they would settle disputes within the camp and advise others on the selection of campsites, work ethics, and food production.

Yavapai bands
The Yavapai peoples were not a political or social unit, but rather four separate autonomous groups. Although culturally, linguistically and ethnically related, they did not identify as Yavapai in a centralized way. These four groups were, for geographical, historical, cultural and familial reasons, in various alliances with neighboring tribes, without regard to the concerns of the adjacent Yavapai groups. The four groups consisted of different local groups, composed primarily of kinship groups known as clans.

The Yavapai divided into subsequent four groups:

Ɖo:lkabaya / Tolkepaya / Tulkepaia or Western Yavapai (often referred to as Yuma-Apaches or Apache-Yuma, because they had close cultural ties to the Yuma and Mohave, lived in the western territory and along the Hassayampa River (Yavapai: Hasaya:mvo/Hasayamcho: "upside down river") in southwestern Arizona)
Wiltaaykapaya/Wiltaikapaya Band ("People of the Two Mountain beside Salome (in Yavapai: Wiltaika)" or Hakeheelapaya/Hakehelapa ("People of the running water, i.e. water from the Harquahala Mountains"), lived in the Harquahala Mountains and Harcuvar Mountains, in the Peeples Valley, Kirkland Valley, upper reaches of the Hassayampa Creek in south-central Arizona)
Ha'kahwađbaya/Hakawhatapa Band ("People along the red water or Red River, i.e., Colorado River") or Mađqwadabaya/Matakwarapa  ("People of the waterless and flat land, i.e. People of the Desert"), were farming along the Colorado River, lived in La Paz and Castle Dome)
Hakupakapaya/Hakupakapa Band or Hnyoqapaya/Inyokapa Band (lived in the mountains north of the present Congress)
Yavbe / Yavapé or Northwestern Yavapai, Central Yavapai (often referred to as Mohave-Apaches (Apache-Mojaves), often called real Yavapai, because they were hardly culturally influenced by neighboring peoples, lived from Williamson (Williamson Valley) south of the Bradshaw Mountains (in Yavapai: Wikanyacha – "rough, black range of rocks") to the Agua Fria River)
Yavbe'/Yavapé Band (claimed land in the upper Verde Valley and surrounding mountains, including the Montezuma Castle National Monument)
Hwaalkyanyanyepaya/Walkeyanyanyepa local group ("People of Mingus Mountain (in Yavapai: Hwa:lkyañaña)", inhabited the mesa where Jerome, Arizona, is located, and the adjacent Mingus Mountain)
Mathaupapaya Band (inhabited the mountains of Prescott up to Crown King and Bumble Bee, Arizona)
Wiikvteepaya/Wikutepa local group ("Great Mountain i.e. Granite Peak People", also known as "Granite Peak Band", lived in the vicinity of present-day Prescott, incorporating Chino Valley, the Sierra Prieta and the northern Bradshaw Mountains)
Wiikenyachapaya/Wikenichapa local group ("People of the rough, black mountain ridge, i.e. of the Bradshaw Mountains (in Yavapai: Wi:kañacha)", also known as "Black Mountain or Crown King Band", lived in the southern Bradshaw Mountains south to Wickenburg area and the middle Agua Fria River)
Wi:pukba / Wipukepaya / Wipukepa ("foot of the mountain (Red Buttes) People" or "People from the Foot of the Red Rock") or Northeastern Yavapai (often referred to as Mohave-Apaches (Apache-Mojaves) or Tonto Apaches, lived in Oak Creek Canyon and along Fossil Creek (in Yavapai: ʼHakhavsuwa or Vialnyucha) and Rio Verde, Arizona, in north-central Arizona, intermarried and formed with Northern Tonto Apache bilingual units and groups)
Matkitwawipa Band ("People of the Upper Verde River Valley (in Yavapai: Matk'amvaha)" or in Apache: Tú Dotl`izh Nde ("Blue Water People, i.e., Fossil Creek band"), lived in the upper Verde Valley, along the East Verde River, West Clear Creek, Fossil Creek, and south to Cave Creek in central Arizona, in English also known as "Fossil Creek Band" (with focus on the Apache).)
Wiipukepaya/Wipukepa Band ("Oak Creek Canyon People", lived in the Redrock Country around Sedona (in Yavapai: Wipuk), harvested corn at Oak Creek and gathering Mesquite in the Verde Valley, were broken up in two bilingual Yavapai-Northern Tonto-Apache local groups)
first Wiipukepaya/Wipukepa local group (in Apache: Tsé Hichii Indee ("Horizontal Red Rock People, i.e., Oak Creek band"), in English also known as "Oak Creek Canyon Band" (focus on the Yavapai) or as "Oak Creek Band" (focus on the Apache).)
second Wiipukepaya/Wipukepa local group (in Apache: Dasziné Dasdaayé Indee ("Porcupine Sitting Above People, i.e., Bald Mountain band"), in English known as "Bald Mountain Band" (focus on the Apache).)
Guwevkabaya / Kwevkepaya / Kwevikopaya ("Southern People") or Southeastern Yavapai, Southern Yavapai (often referred to as Tonto Apaches, lived along the Verde River south of the Mazatzal Mountains and the Salt River to the Superstition Mountains and the western Sierra Estrella Mountains, including the southern and western slopes of the Pinal Mountains, the McDowell Mountains, Dripping Springs, the Four Peaks and Mazatzal Mountains in south-western Arizona, intermarried and formed with Southern Tonto Apache and the Pinaleño/Pinal Apache Band and Arivaipa/Aravaipa Band of the San Carlos Apache bilingual units and groups/clans)
Hwaalkamvepaya/Walkamepa Band ("Pine Mountains People", along the Southern Highway from Miami, Arizona, to Phoenix, and on to Superior, Arizona)
Hwaalkamvepaya/Walkamepa clan ("actual" or "real" Walkamepa,  in Apache:  ("Gray Cottonwoods in the Rocks People, i.e., Pinaleño/Pinal Apache band") lived in the southern and western Pinal Mountains, called Walkame – "pine mountains", also known in English as "Pinaleño/Pinal Apache Band" of the San Carlos Apache.)
Ilihasitumapa clan ("wood-sticking-out-of-middle-of-water People", in Apache:  ("Gray Cottonwoods in the Rocks People, i.e., Pinaleño/Pinal Apache band") lived in the northern Pinaleno Mountains, therefore also known in English as "Pinaleño/Pinal Apache Band" of the San Carlos Apache.)
further Hwaalkamvepaya/Walkamepa clan (Yavapai name not known), in Apache: Dzil Dlaazhe ("Mount Turnbull Apache") lived in the Santa Teresa Mountains including Mount Turnbull, in English most widely known as "Arivaipa Apache clan" of the San Carlos Apache.)
Wiikchasapaya/Wikedjasapa Band ("People of the McDowell Mountains (in Yavapai: Wi:kajasa)", lived along the Apache Trail from Phoenix (in Yavapai: Wathinka/Wakatehe; Western Apache: Fiinigis) to Miami onto the Roosevelt Dam along Tonto Creek including today's Tonto National Monument.)
Amahiyukpa clan ("wild melon People", lived in the mountains west of the Verde River, north of Lime Creek, also known as the McDowell Mountains about twenty miles north-east of Phoenix)
Atachiopa clan ("Arrowreed People", lived in the mountains west of Cherry, Arizona)
Hakayopa clan ("Cottonwood People", in Apache: Tsé Nołtłʼizhn ("Rocks in a Line of Greenness People, i.e., Mazatzal band of the Southern Tonto Apache"), lived in the Sunflower Valley, south of Mazatzal Peak up in the Mazatzal Mountains and west of Fort Reno in the Tonto Basin in central Arizona, in English known as "Mazatzal Band" (focus on the Apache).)
Hichapulvapa clan ("bunch-of-wood-sticking-up People", in Apache: Tsé Nołtłʼizhn ("Rocks in a Line of Greenness People, i.e., Mazatzal band of the Southern Tonto Apache"), lived in the Mazatzal Mountains south from the East Verde River and west of the North Peak (in Yavapai: Iwilamaya - "brushy rolling hills") to the Mazatzal Peak, in English known as "Mazatzal Band" (focus on the Apache).)

Both in the Walkamepa and Wikedjasapa, the following clans were represented and shared mostly overlapping territories:
Iiwilkamepa clan ("grassy-plateau People", lived between the Superstition and Pinal mountains)
Matkawatapa clan ("red-strata-country People, i.e. Sierra Ancha People", in Apache: Dilzhę́’é/Dil Zhe`é ("People with high-pitched voices, i.e., Dil Zhęʼé semi-band of the Southern Tonto Apache"), according to a tradition of mixed marriages of Walkamepa with the Apache of the Sierra Ancha in central Arizona)
Yelyuchopa clan ("mescal-pit People", lived in the Mazatzal Mountains between the territories of the Hakayopa and Hichapulvapa)
Onalkeopa clan ("Rocky-Place People", lived in the Mazatzal Mountains between the territories of the Hichapulvapa and Yelyuchopa, but later moved south into the territory of Walkamepa)

Interaction with neighboring Apache 
The Wi:pukba ("People from the Foot of the Red Rock") and Guwevkabaya lived alongside the Dilzhę́’é Apache (Tonto Apache) of central and western Arizona. The Tonto Apache lived usually east of the Verde River and most of the Yavapai bands lived west of it. The Wi:pukba tribal areas in the San Francisco Peaks, along the Upper Verde River, Oak Creek Canyon and Fossil Creek, overlapped with those of the Northern Tonto Apache.

Likewise the Guwevkabaya shared hunting and gathering grounds east of the Verde River, along Fossil Creek, East Verde River, Salt River and in the Superstition Mountains, Sierra Ancha and Pinaleno Mountains with Southern Tonto Apache and bands of the San Carlos Apache. Therefore, they formed bilingual mixed-tribal bands. Outsiders, such as the Spanish, Mexicans and Americans distinguished the peoples primarily by language, but often referred to them as one name. The Apache spoke the Tonto dialect of the Western Apache language (Ndee biyati' / Nnee biyati), and the Yavapai spoke the Yavapai language, a branch of Upland Yuman. Living together in common rancherias, families identified as Apache or Yavapai based on their “Mother tongue.” Both groups had matrilineal kinship systems, with children considered born into the mother's family and clan, with inheritance and property figured through the maternal line.

Most of the people in these mixed groups spoke both languages. The headman of each band usually had two names, one from each culture. Therefore, the enemy Navajo to the north called both, the Tonto Apache and their allies, the Yavapai, Dilzhʼíʼ dinéʼiʼ – "People with high-pitched voices." The ethnic Europeans referred to the Yavapai and Apache together as Tonto or Tonto Apache. The peoples raided and warred together against enemy tribes such as the Tohono O'odham and the Akimel O'odham.

Scholars cannot tell from records whether the writers of the time, when using the term Tonto Apache, were referring to Yavapai or Apache, or those mixed bands. In addition, the Europeans often referred to the Wi:pukba and Guwevkabaya incorrectly as the Yavapai Apache or Yuma Apache. The Europeans referred to the Ɖo:lkabaya, the southwestern group of Yavapai, and the Hualapai (who belonged to the Upland Yuma Peoples), as Yuma Apache or Mohave Apache.

Ethnological writings describe some major physical differences between Yavapai and Tonto Apache peoples. The Yavapai were described as taller, of more muscular build, well-proportioned and thickly featured, while the Tonto Apache were slight and less muscular, smaller of stature and finely featured. The Yavapai women were described as stouter and having "handsomer" faces than the Yuma, in a historic Smithsonian Institution report. The Yavapai often acquired tattoos, but the Apache seldom used tattoos. They created different painted designs on faces. They also had different funeral practices. In clothing, Yavapai moccasins were rounded, whereas those of the Apaches were shaped with pointed toes. Both groups were hunter-gatherers. They left campsites so similar that scholars are seldom able to distinguish between them.

History

According to their creation story, the Yavapai believe that their people originated "in the beginning," or "many years ago," when either a tree, or a maize plant sprouted from the ground in what is now Montezuma Well, bringing the Yavapai into the world. Most archeologists agree that the Yavapai originated from Patayan groups who migrated east from the Colorado River region to become Upland Yumans. Archeological and linguistic evidence suggests that they split off to develop as the Yavapai somewhere around 1300.

Warfare was not uncommon in the Yavapai world, and they made changing alliances for security. Wi:pukba (Wipukepa) and Guwevkabaya (Kwevkepaya) bands formed alliances with Western Apache bands, to attack and defend against raids by the Pima and Maricopa bands from the south. Because of the greater strength of the Pima/Maricopa, Yavapai/Apache raids generally conducted small-scale quick raids, followed by a retreat to avoid counter-attack. The Yavapai defended their lands against Pima incursions, when the Pima would invade to harvest saguaro fruits.

To the north and northwest, Wi:pukba and Yavbe' bands had off-and-on relations with the Pai people throughout most of their history. Though Pai and Yavapai both spoke Upland Yuman dialects, and had a common cultural history, each people had tales of a dispute that separated them from each other. According to Pai myth, the dispute began with a "mudball fight between children." Scholars believe this split occurred around 1750.

The last big battle between the Colorado–Gila River alliances took place in August 1857, when about 100 Yavapai, Quechan, and Mohave warriors attacked a settlement of Maricopa near Pima Butte. After overwhelming the Maricopa, the Yavapai left. A group of Pima, supplied with guns and horses from US troops, arrived and routed the remaining Mohave and Quechans.

European contact
The first recorded contact with Yavapai was made by Antonio de Espejo, who was brought to Jerome Mountain by Hopi guides in 1583, looking for gold. De Espejo was disappointed to find only copper. In 1598, Hopi brought Marcos Farfán de los Godos and his group to the same mines, to their excitement. Farfán referred to the Yavapai as "cruzados" because of the crosses painted on their heads. A group led by Juan de Oñate led another group through Yavapai lands in 1598, and again in 1604–1605, looking for a route to the sea which Yavapai had told them about. After this, no other European contact was made for more than 200 years.

In the intervening time, through contact with other tribes that had more European contact, the Yavapai began to adopt certain European practices. They raised some livestock and planted crops, also adopting some modern tools and weaponry. In a syncretic way, they adopted elements of Christianity. An estimated 25% of the population died as a result of smallpox in the 17th and 18th centuries, smaller losses than for some tribes, but substantial enough to disrupt their societies. With the use of guns and other weapons, they began to change methods of warfare, diplomacy, and trade. They used livestock raiding, either from other tribes such as the Maricopa, or from Spanish settlements to their south, to supplement their economy. They often acquired human captives in raids, whom they traded as slaves to Spaniards in exchange for European goods.

In the 1820s, beaver trappers, having depleted the beaver population of the Rocky Mountains, began entering Yavapai territory. They trapped beaver along the Salt, Gila, and Bill Williams rivers. When Kit Carson and Ewing Young led a trapping group through the territory in 1829, the group was "nightly harassed..." Traps were stolen and some of their horses and mules killed.

Following the declaration of war against Mexico in May 1845 and especially after the claim by the US of southwest lands under the Treaty of Guadalupe-Hidalgo, US military incursions into Yavapai territory greatly increased. After gold was discovered in California in 1849, more White emigrants passed through Yavapai territory than ever had before. Despite the thousands of emigrants passing through their territory, the Yavapai avoided contact with Whites.

The first fighting between US troops and Yavapai came in early 1837, when the Tolkepaya joined with their Quechan neighbors to defend against Major Samuel Heintzelman over a Quechan ferry crossing on the Colorado River. The Quechan used the ferry to transport settlers over the river, into California. After they killed a group led by John Glanton, who had taken over the crossing, the US government retaliated by burning the fields of the Quechans, and taking control of the crossing.

According to Thomas Sweeney, the Tolkepaya would tell US officers encountered in Quechan territory, that they had a 30-day march to their own territory. They wanted to discourage US encroachment on their land.

Oatman family

In 1851, the Oatman family was ambushed by a group of tribal members, possibly Ɖo:lkabaya Yavapai, though many historians argue that it is impossible to know. Roys Oatman and his wife were killed, along with four of their seven children. The son, Lorenzo, was left for dead but survived, while sisters Olive and Mary Ann were later sold to Mojaves as slaves. The story was widely published, and increased white settlers' fears of attack in Arizona.

Gold
When in early 1863, the Walker Party discovered gold in Lynx Creek (near present-day Prescott, Arizona), it set off a chain of events that would have White settlements along the Hassayampa and Agua Fria Rivers, the nearby valleys, as well as in Prescott, and Fort Whipple would be built, all by the end of the year, and all in traditional Yavapai territory.

Interactions with the US government

The Yavapai Wars, or the Tonto Wars, were a series of armed conflicts between the Yavapai and Tonto tribes against the United States in Arizona. The period began no later than 1861, with the arrival of American settlers on Yavapai and Tonto land. At the time, the Yavapai were considered a band of the Western Apache people due to their close relationship with tribes such as the Tonto and Pinal. 366 to 489 Yavapai were killed in massacres, and 375 perished in Indian Removal deportations out of 1,400 remaining Yavapai.

Reservation life

Yavapai–Apache Nation
After being relocated to the Camp Verde Reservation, on the Verde River near Camp Verde, the Yavapai there began to construct irrigation systems (including a five-mile (8 km) long ditch) that functioned well enough to reap sufficient harvests, making the tribe relatively self-sufficient. But contractors that worked with the government to supply the reservations were disappointed, and petitioned to have the reservation revoked. The government complied, and in March 1875, the government closed the reservation, and marched the residents  to the San Carlos reservation. More than 100 Yavapai died during the winter trek.

By the early 1900s, Yavapai were drifting away from the San Carlos Reservation, and were requesting permission to live on the grounds of the original Camp Verde Reservation. In 1910,  was set aside as the Camp Verde Indian Reservation, and in the following decade added  in two parcels, which became the Middle Verde Indian Reservation. These two reservations were combined in 1937, to form the Camp Verde Yavapai–Apache tribe. Today, the reservation spans , in four separate locales. Tourism contributes greatly to the economy of the tribe, due largely to the presence of many preserved sites, including the Montezuma Castle National Monument. The Yavapai–Apache Nation is the amalgamation of two historically distinct Tribes both of whom occupied the Upper Verde prior to European arrival. The Tonto Apache, calling themselves Dilzhe'e, utilized the lands to the north, east and south; while the Wi:pukba or Northeastern Yavapai were using country to the north, the west and the south. It was the Upper Verde where they overlapped.

Yavapai Prescott Indian Reservation
thumb|250px|Fort McDowell Yavapai Reservation
The Yavapai reservation in Prescott was established in 1935, originally consisting of just  of land formerly occupied by the Fort Whipple Military Reserve. In 1956, an additional  were added. Succeeding the tribe's first chief, Sam Jimulla, his wife Viola became the first female chieftess of a North American tribe. Today, the tribe consists of 159 official members. The population consist mainly of the Yavbe'/Yavapé Group of Yavapais.

Fort McDowell Reservation
The Fort McDowell Yavapai Nation is located within Maricopa County approximately 20 miles northeast of Phoenix. The reservation came into existence when Theodore Roosevelt had Fort McDowell declared a  reservation in 1903, but by 1910, the Office of Indian Affairs was attempting to relocate the residents, to open up the area, and water rights to other interests. A delegation of Yavapai testified to a Congressional Committee against this, and won. Today, the tribal community consists of 900 members, 600 of whom live on the reservation and the remaining 300 who live off the reservation. The Guwevkabaya or Southeastern Yavapai on Fort McDowell Reservation call themselves A'ba:ja - "The People" therefore some anthropologists and linguists believe, that the name Apache for the various Southern Athabascan peoples derives from the self-designation of the Yavapai. The population of Fort McDowell consists of the Guwevkabaya Yavapai.

Orme Dam conflict
Responding to growth in the Phoenix area, in the early 1970s Arizonan officials proposed to build a dam at the point where the Verde and Salt rivers meet. The dam would have flooded two-thirds of the  reservation. In return, the members of the tribe (at the time consisting of 425 members) were offered homes and cash settlements. But in 1976, the tribe rejected the offer by a vote of 61%, claiming that the tribe would be effectively disbanded by the move. In 1981, after much petitioning of the US government, and a three-day march by approximately 100 Yavapai, the plan to build the dam was withdrawn.

Language

The Yavapai language is one of three dialects of the Upland Yuman language, itself a member of the Pai branch of the Yuman language family.
The language includes three dialects, which have been referred to as Western, Northeastern and Southeastern, as well as Prescott, Verde Valley, and Ɖo:lkabaya.

 Yavapai chiefs and headmen Tonto leader (bilingual Kwevkepaya-Tonto-Apache or Kwevkepaya-Pinaleño-Apache leader)
 Delshay (Delshe, Delchea, Delacha or Tel Che'e – ′Red Ant′, the Yavapai called him Wah-poo-eta or Wapotehe – ‘Big Rump’, Kwevkepaya-Tonto-Apache leader, his bilingual mixed band of the Matkawatapa local group of the Walkamepa-Kwevkepaya and Southern Tonto-Apache with about 200 members lived in the Sierra Ancha with their western limit forming the Tonto Creek and in the east Cherry Creek, but often they were reported living in the Mazatzal Mountains west of their core range, not to be confused with Wah-poo-eta, * about 1835; was involved in the killing of Lt. Jacob Almy at San Carlos in 1873 and fled after the murder along with Chuntz, Cochinay, and Chan-deisi into the wilderness, was tracked down by Apache scouts under Desalin and killed on 29. July 1874, his head together with 76 captured Kwevkepaya-Tonto were brought in Camp McDowell)
 Wah-poo-eta (Wapotehe, Wapooita – ‘Big Rump’, the Apache called him Delacha or Delshe – ′Red Ant′, Kwevkepaya-Tonto-Apache leader, about 750 band members, mostly Kwevkepaya and some Southern Tonto-Apache of the Mazatzal band, his band living in the southern Mazatzal Mountains was known to be the largest and fiercest band, because he refused to make peace with the Americans little is known about him, not to be confused with Delshay, *?; killed † 15. August 1869 by a band of 44 Maricopa and Akimel O'odham under the Maricopa war leader Juan Chivaria in Castle Creek Canyon)
 Eschetlepan (Apache name Tc'à'łìbà -hń ("Brown Hat"), also Chalipun, Cha-Thle-Pah, Choltepun, called by the US Army Charlie Pan, Kwevkepaya-Tonto-Apache leader, was himself a Southern Tonto-Apache of the Mazatzal (Tsé Nołtłʼizhn) band, his mixed band consisted mostly of Wikedjasapa-Kwevkepaya, his Apache following belonged to the Mazatzal (Tsé Nołtłʼizhn) and four of the six semi-bands of the Southern Tonto, his band of about 100 people lived southwest of Green Valley and south of the East Verde River, about ten miles east of the Verde River into the northern slopes of the Mazatzal Mountains, therefore they could easily raid in the Prescott and Wickenburg areas)
 Ashcavotil (Ascavotil, in Apache Escavotil, Kwevkepaya-Pinaleno-Apache leader, his band of about 200 warriors was living east of Cherry Creek southward along both sides of the Salt River and in the Pinaleno Mountains, next to Wah-poo-eta he was the most warlike leader in central Arizona, heavily armed and well supplied with ammunition from Apache on the Fort Goodwin reservation, his warriors raided and warred as far south as Tucson, Sacaton and Camp Grant)
 Oshkolte (Hascalté, Has-Kay-Ah-Yol-Tel, Tonto-Apache-Kwevkepaya leader, to his band belonged 70 warriors, 20 women and 20 children, his band – made up mostly of Southern Tonto-Apache and some Kwevkepaya – ranged on both sides of the Tonto Creek north to the East Verde River and south to the Salt River, close ally of Ashcavotil and Wah-poo-eta, his warriors were well armed but depended on Ashcavotil and Wah-poo-eta for ammunition, lived east of the Four Peaks in the Mazatzal Mountains towards the Salt River, killed † March 1873)
 Nanni-chaddi (Tonto-Apache-Kwevkepaya leader, *?; was responsible for many raids on Akimel O'Odham and white settlements along the Salt and Gila River, killed † 28. December 1872 in the Battle of Salt River Canyon, also called Skeleton Cave Massacre, 130 troopers from the 5th Cavalry Regiment led by Captain William H. Brown and 30 Indian Scouts, killed 76 men, women and children, 15 more were dying at the Skeleton Cave (only 18 women and 6 children survived and were taken into captivity)
 Skiitlanoyah (Skitianoyah, in Yavapai Skitlavisyah, Kwevkepaya-Tonto-Apache leader, his mixed band of about 80 people resided north of Delshay's band between the middle East Verde River and the upper Tonto Creek north to the Mogollon Rim)
 Piyahgonte (Pi-yah-gon-te, Yavapai-Tonto-Apache leader in the 1860s and 1870s, with his band of about 75 people he was living along both sides of the upper East Verde River north to the Mogollon Rim, he was believed to be responsible for the most of the depredations around Prescott)
 Natatotel (Natokel or Notokel, Kwevkepaya-Tonto-Apache leader, killed † June 1873)Kwevkepaya leader Pawchine
 Sygollah (Saygully, went to Washington with John Clum and Arivaipa Apache Chief Eskiminzin, a Pinaleño Apache of the San Carlos Apache by birth)
 Sekwalakawala
 Wehabesuwa (leader of a band in the Bloody Basin)Wipukepa leader Motha (“Fog: Mist”, leader of a band in the Oak Creek Canyon, later assigned “Head Chief” of Verde Indians – Tolkepaya, Yavapé, Wipukepa, Kwevkepaya and Tonto Apache – on the Rio Verde Reservation)
 Paquala (“Tall Man”)
 Tecoomthaya (led in the summer of 1872 about 200 Wipukepa to the extreme north of their territory in order to escape the Army and camped dispersed in the Bill Williams Mountains, there they hoped to get ammunition and guns from the Havasupai and Southern Paiutes in exchange of buckskins. However, a force of U.S. soldiers with the aid of Pai scouts tracked them down and attacked them without warming and option of surrender. While most of the Yavapai escaped, the soldiers burned all of their supplies and food)Yavapé leader Hoseckrua (also Hochachiwaca, killed † January 1864 as soldiers from Fort Whipple attacked his band, killing 28 Yavapé, including Hoseckrua)
 Coquannathacka (“Grean Leaf”, leader of the Hwaalkyanyanyepaya in the Bradshaw Mountains and Mingus Mountains)
 Makwa (“Quail's Topknot”, leader of the Wiikvteepaya (Wikutepa, also known as “Granite Peak Band”) in the Bradshaw Mountains and Granite Mountains)Tolkepaya leader'''
 Quashackama (also Quacanthewya)
 Ohatchecama (Ochecama, Ochicama, Ahoochy Kahmah, A-wha-che-ka-ma – “Striking the Enemy with the Fist” or simply “Striking Enemy”, leader in the first Skull Valley massacre)
 Chawmasecha (“Looking Over”)
 Chemewalasela
 Pakota (Pocati – “Big Man” or Nya-kwa-la-hwa-la - "Long Black Fellow", called by Whites José Coffee, travelled with his nephew Takodawa as spokesman in 1872 to Washington, D.C. and met with President Ulysses S. Grant)
 Takodawa ("Hanging on a limb", later called Washington Charley, accompanied his uncle Pakota to Washington in 1872)

In popular culture

In Hell on Wheels season 1, Eva tells Elam she was traded, for three blankets and a horse, to the tribe that tattooed her. In episode 8 ("Derailed"), Eva tells Lily the Yavapai hacked up and scalped Eva's parents, and raped her sister then bashed out her brains with rocks, but Eva had the pox and they wouldn't touch her. Instead, they traded her to some Mojave.

The Yavapai feature heavily in the psychedelic/western album Eyes Like the Sky by Australian band King Gizzard & the Lizard Wizard. It tells of an Irish-American boy in the American West during the time of the Civil War who is kidnapped by a war band of Yavapai and raised as their own. He becomes a legendary warrior named for his stunning eyes.

See also

Indigenous peoples in Arizona
History of Arizona

References

Sources
 
 Campbell, Julie A. (1998). Studies in Arizona History. Tucson, Arizona: Arizona Historical Society. 
 Coffer, William E. (1982). Sipapu, the Story of the Indians of Arizona and New Mexico, Van Nostrand Reinhold, .
 Fenn, Al, "The Story of Mickey Burns", Sun Valley Spur Shopper, September 30, 1971
 Fish, Paul R. and Fish, Suzanne K. (1977). Verde Valley Archaeology: Review & Prospective, Flagstaff: Museum of Northern Arizona, Anthropology research report #8
 Gifford, Edward (1936). Northeastern and Western Yavapai. Berkeley, California: University of California Press.
 Hoxie, Frederick E. (1996). Encyclopedia of North American Indians, Houghton Mifflin Books, .
 Jones, Terry L. and Klar, Kathryn A. (2007). California Prehistory: Colonization, Culture, and Complexity, Rowman Altamira, .
 Kendall, Martha B. (1976). Selected Problems in Yavapai Syntax. New York: Garland Publishing, Inc., .
 Nelson Espeland, Wendy (1998). The Struggle for Water: Politics, Rationality, and Identity in the American Southwest, University of Chicago Press. 
 Pritzker, Harry (2000). A Native American Encyclopedia: History, Culture, and Peoples, Oxford University Press, .
 Ruland Thorne, Kate; Rodda, Jeanette; Smith, Nancy R. (2005). Experience Jerome: The Moguls, Miners, and Mistresses of Cleopatra Hill, Primer Publishers, .
 Salzmann, Zdenek and Salzmann, Joy M. (1997). Native Americans of the Southwest: The Serious Traveler's Introduction to Peoples and Places. Boulder, Colorado: Westview Press. 
 Swanton, John Reed (1952). The Indian Tribes of North America, US Government Printing Office.
 University of California, Berkeley (1943). University of California Publications in Linguistics, University of California Press.
 Utley, Robert Marshall (1981). Frontiersmen in Blue: The United States Army and the Indian, 1848–1865'', University of Nebraska Press, .
 Big Dry Wash Battlfield, Arizona at NPS
Fort McDowell Yavapai Nation , history and culture
 Yavapai-Apache Nation , official site
 Yavapai Prescott Indian Tribe, official site

External links
Yavapai-Prescott Tribe
Yavapai-Apache Nation of the Camp Verde Reservation 
Fort McDowell Yavapai Nation

 
Native American tribes in Arizona
History of Yavapai County, Arizona
People from Yavapai County, Arizona
Native American history of Arizona